Two ships of the Iranian Navy have been named Sahand:

  (ex-IIS Faramarz), an Alvand-class frigate launched in 1969 and sunk in 1988
 , a Moudge-class frigate launched in 2012

Ship names